Rara avis is a Latin phrase for 'rare bird'.

Rara avis may refer to:

Rara Avis, Mississippi, an American ghost town
Rara avis, an artwork by Ralph Helmick
Rara avis, a 2005 exhibition about Iris Apfel
RARA AVIS, a musical ensemble featuring Ken Vandermark
Rara Avis, a 1985 documentary about Bridget Bate Tichenor

See also
Black swan
Satire VI by Juvenal, containing the line: rara avis in terris nigroque simillima cygno, 'a rare bird in the lands, and very like a black swan'